"Mighty Long Fall/Decision" is the ninth single by Japanese rock band ONE OK ROCK. It was released on July 30, 2014 under the A-Sketch label. It received a digital download single certification of Gold from the Recording Industry Association of Japan for sales of 100,000. The song "Mighty Long Fall" peaked at number 2 on the Billboard Japan Hot 100, with its B-sides "Decision" and "Pieces of Me" peaking at 12 and 30 respectively. The single reached number 2 and stayed on the Oricon charts for 17 weeks. The song "Mighty Long Fall" was used in the live-action film Rurouni Kenshin: Kyoto Inferno.

Music video 
The official video for "Mighty Long Fall" uses the Japanese version of the song, released at the same day as the single. It was filmed in Tokyo and directed by Ryohei Shingu, featuring the band performing the track in a large hall. On the other hand, there were several masked men beating drums. Each blow cracks the floor of the building, and some people are seen falling into the dark abyss. Towards the end of the video, the floor of the building collapses, leaving a place where the band plays music.

The music video for "Decision" also uses the Japanese version of the song, released on August 20, 2014. It contains a compilation footage from their Who Are You?? Who Are We?? tour in Europe and Asia which also featured in Fool Cool Rock! Documentary Film directed by Hiroyuki Nakano.

Track listing

Personnel
One Ok Rock
 Takahiro "Taka" Moriuchi — lead vocals
 Toru Yamashita — lead guitar, rhythm guitar
 Ryota Kohama — bass guitar
 Tomoya Kanki — drums, percussion

Charts

Single

Songs

Certifications

Awards
MTV Video Music Awards Japan

|-
| 2015
| "Mighty Long Fall"
| Best Group Video
| 
|}

References 

2014 songs
One Ok Rock songs
Songs written by Takahiro Moriuchi
Songs written by John Feldmann
A-Sketch singles
Japanese film songs
Songs written by Arnold Lanni